H. dubia may refer to:
 Heteranthera dubia, the water stargrass and grassleaf mudplantain, an aquatic plant species
 Hierodula dubia, a praying mantis species

See also
 Dubia (disambiguation)